The Ängsö Ladies Open was a women's professional golf tournament on the Swedish Golf Tour played annually from 1988 until 1994. It was always held at the Ängsö Golf Club in Västerås, Sweden.

Winners

References

Swedish Golf Tour (women) events
Golf tournaments in Sweden
Defunct sports competitions in Sweden
Recurring sporting events established in 1988
Recurring sporting events disestablished in 1994